Juliana Santos may refer to:

 Juliana Paula dos Santos (born 1983), Brazilian middle-distance runner
 Juliana Chaves Santos (born 1990), Brazilian gymnast
 Juliana dos Santos (birth date unknown c. 1985) East Timorese sex trafficking victim